Moravany is a village and large municipality in Michalovce District in the Kosice Region of eastern Slovakia.

Village major - Vladimir Ceklovsky

Municipal authority contact number- +421 56/688 46 46

Nearest airport - Košice International Airport. 

Distance from airport 61km (38 miles) - 56 minutes. Airport taxi would charge €100, however if you book taxi trough Bolt it will be around €50-60.

Another option is to get taxi( preferably Bolt - €6-8) to train station or bus station- they are nearby each other. Over there you can buy a ticket to Michalovce ( district town). Ticket cost €2-3 per person. From Michalovce another direct bus to Moravany- €1.

History
In historical records the village was first mentioned in 1247.

Geography
The village lies at an altitude of 108 metres and covers an area of 16.667 km². The municipality has a population of about 1,040 people.

Famous people
Dušan Rapoš, film director
Vincent Obsitnik, United States ambassador to Slovakia

References

External links

Villages and municipalities in Michalovce District